Fair Play Trophy may refer to:

Association football
FIFA Club World Cup Fair Play Trophy
FIFA Women's World Cup Fair Play Trophy
FIFA World Cup Fair Play Trophy
Pakistan Premier League Fair Play Trophy

Other
Canada West University Hockey Fair Play Trophy

See also
Fair Play Award (disambiguation)